Jeffrey Boone Stutz (born November 4, 1982) was a former tight end and long snapper for Texas A&M University and long snapper in the National Football League. He was released by the Seattle Seahawks on December 11, 2007. Stutz is the son of Barbara and Paul Stutz of Arlington, Texas.

High school career
He met then TCU head coach Dennis Franchione and planned to walk on for the Horned Frogs. When Franchione became the head coach at Alabama, Stutz packed his bags for Tuscaloosa

College career

He redshirted at Alabama. In 2002, he played one game with the Crimson Tide for Franchione. When Franchione accepted the head coach position at Texas A&M, Stutz followed him to College Station and enrolled at A&M in the fall. Stutz sat out the football season per NCAA transfer rules. He had a solid 2004 season at Texas A&M, starting eight games at tight end in playing in all 12 of the Aggies games as a deep snapper and on special teams. Had 11 catches for 142 yards and one touchdown. Nine of his catches produced first downs. Had a career-best four catches for 49 yards against Clemson.

In 2005, he became the team's full-time deep snapper, playing in all 12 of the Aggies' games in that capacity and started two games at tight end, making two catches for 26 yards and a touchdown. He also caught a 7-yard touchdown pass in the Magnolia Gridiron All-Star Classic – a postseason all-star game.

Professional career

2006 season

He was originally signed as an undrafted rookie free agent with the Tampa Bay Buccaneers. After being cut by the Bucs, Stutz was picked up by the Atlanta Falcons and won the starting long snapping job. He was the snapper when Morten Andersen broke the NFL career scoring record, and is featured in the Pro Football Hall of Fame.

2007 season
On October 2, 2007 the Falcons released him. He signed with the Seahawks on October 10, 2007.

NASCAR career
In 2014, Stutz transitioned to NASCAR, joining Stewart-Haas Racing's pit stop development program. The following year, he became the gasman for SHR driver Danica Patrick's No. 10 team.

References

External links
Texas A&M Athletics bio
Magnolia All-Star Classic

1982 births
Living people
American football tight ends
American football long snappers
Texas A&M Aggies football players
Atlanta Falcons players
Seattle Seahawks players